Sand Ridge is an Unincorporated community in north central Wharton County, Texas, United States. The settlement is located northwest of Wharton at the intersection of FM 102 and County Road 259. Situated on the former Cane Belt Railroad, the settlement had its own school in 1905. There were no road signs identifying the place in 2013, but a church and a cemetery with the community name occupied the site. Some homes and several oil wells were located nearby.

History
In 1905 there were 50 black students enrolled in the Sand Ridge school, which also had one teacher. The first producing oil well in Wharton County was drilled in 1925 in the Boling Field near Iago. This started an oil drilling boom during which numerous fields were exploited. Maps of 1936 displayed two churches, a cemetery and several homes in Sand Ridge. In the 1980s the New Colorado Tabernacle Church and another church and several homes were in the vicinity. The railroad was discontinued in 1992 and the rails removed. In 2013 the Sandridge Baptist Church and the adjacent San Ridge & Mt Gilead Cemetery were located at the site.

References
Footnotes

Citations

Unincorporated communities in Wharton County, Texas
Unincorporated communities in Texas